Sufiabad may refer to:
 Sufiabad, Razavi Khorasan
 Sufiabad, Semnan
 Sufiabad, West Azerbaijan
 Sufiabad, Salmas, West Azerbaijan Province